The Withers House in Somerset, Kentucky, at 116 Maple St., was built in 1890.  It was listed on the National Register of Historic Places in 1984.

It was described in 1984 as one of Somerset's "largest and best preserved Queen Anne style homes."  It is or was a two-story brick house with a one-story frame porch having Tuscan columns upon brick piers, and having a corner octagonal tower.

The house may have been moved or destroyed.

References

National Register of Historic Places in Pulaski County, Kentucky
Queen Anne architecture in Kentucky
Houses completed in 1890
1890 establishments in Kentucky
Houses on the National Register of Historic Places in Kentucky
Former buildings and structures in Kentucky
Houses in Pulaski County, Kentucky
Somerset, Kentucky